Maher Hammam  is an Egyptian football defender who played for Egypt in the 1980 African Cup of Nations. He also played for Al Ahli.

References

External links

Egyptian footballers
Egypt international footballers
1980 African Cup of Nations players
Association football defenders
1956 births
Living people